The Orcadian was a named passenger train operating in the United Kingdom.

History
The service was introduced in April 1936 by the London, Midland and Scottish Railway. It was given to the 6.30am train from Inverness, and the return service from Wick at 3.35pm.

The train was retained in the era of British Rail and in 1964 offered a journey time of four hours, compared with other services on the line taking five hours.

References

Named passenger trains of the London, Midland and Scottish Railway
Named passenger trains of British Rail
Rail transport in Scotland
Railway services introduced in 1936
1936 establishments in England